The Pekin Bantam is a British breed of bantam chicken. It derives from birds brought to Europe from China in the nineteenth century, and is named for the city of Peking where it was believed to have originated. It is a true bantam, with no corresponding large fowl. It is recognised only in the United Kingdom, where the Cochin has no recognised bantam version; like the Cochin, it has heavy feathering to the legs and feet. The Entente Européenne treats the Pekin Bantam as equivalent to the bantam Cochin.

History
The first Pekins are alleged to have been looted from the private collection of the Emperor of China at Peking (now known as Beijing) by British soldiers towards the end of the Second Opium War around 1860.  However, some sources suggest that a consignment of birds from China around 1835 were given to Queen Victoria, assuming the name of 'Shanghais' and that these birds were bred with further imports and were developed into the breed we know today as Pekins.  The Pekins first brought to the United Kingdom are said to have been buff in colour, with blacks and cuckoos arriving later on. They are known in the United States and Canada as Cochin Bantams.

Characteristics 

The Pekin is a true bantam, that is, a breed of miniature chicken which has no large fowl counterpart. They are rather round-shaped, and their carriage tilts forward, with the head slightly closer to the ground than their elaborate tail feathers. This 'tilt' is a key characteristic of the Pekin. The bird on the whole, though the tail especially, should be abundantly feathered, and well rounded. The cockerels often have longer feathers that protrude outwards from their feet. The range of Pekin colours is extensive, and the list is continually growing. Colours include black, blue, buff, cuckoo, mottled, barred, Columbian, lavender, partridge, white, birchen, silver partridge, and salmon. Rarer colours are in great demand, and many breeders spend much time perfecting new lines of colours in their birds. Frizzled Pekins are common.

Pekin Bantams are very docile, and with careful and regular handling they make ideal pets, especially for families with younger children. However, the Pekin bantam cocks can still be aggressive and defensive of their territory and mates once they reach sexual maturity, but are generally gentle natured.

The hens are regularly broody and are known to be good sitters and attentive mothers. They are not very productive egg layers. Some will lay a few eggs during the winter months.

Care must be taken so that the Pekin's foot feathering does not get soiled. Soiled feet could lead to foot rot or the chicken becoming lame. Vent feathers may have to be trimmed to maximise fertility when breeding.

Gallery

References 

Bantam chicken breeds
Chicken breeds
Chicken breeds originating in China